Coilopus is a genus of the assassin bug family (Reduviidae), in the subfamily Harpactorinae. Species of this genus mimic wasps of the genus Vespa.

Partial list of species
Coilopus vellus
Coilopus crabus

References

Reduviidae
Cimicomorpha genera